Sailing (as Yachting) was contested at the 1998 Asian Games from December 8 to December 13. Competition took place in various sailing disciplines at the Ao-dongtarn Jomtien Beach in Pattaya, Chonburi Province.

Medalists

Men

Women

Open

Medal table

Participating nations
A total of 122 athletes from 16 nations competed in sailing at the 1998 Asian Games:

References
 Results

External links 
 Olympic Council of Asia

 
1998 Asian Games events
1998
Asian Games
Sailing competitions in Thailand